David Simailak (born c. 1952) is a Canadian politician. He was the Member of the Legislative Assembly (MLA) for the electoral district of Baker Lake having won the seat in the 2004 Nunavut election. Simailak was the Minister of Finance and the Minister Responsible for the Liquor Licensing Board.

Prior to becoming an MLA in the Legislative Assembly of Nunavut Simailak was the mayor of Baker Lake and vice-chair of the Nunavut Power Corporation.

On 11 September 2008, a report by acting integrity commissioner Norman Pickell was tabled in the Legislative Assembly. The report stated that Simailak had violated the Integrity Act while acting as Minister of Finance from 2005 to 2007.

His son Craig Simailak was elected to the legislative assembly to represent Baker Lake in 2020.

Rape conviction
Simailak was found guilty of rape in April 2022 in connection to an incident that occurred in 1973.

References

External links
David Simailak at the Legislative Assembly of Nunavut

Living people
Inuit from the Northwest Territories
Inuit politicians
People from Baker Lake
Members of the Legislative Assembly of Nunavut
21st-century Canadian politicians
Mayors of places in Nunavut
Inuit from Nunavut
Year of birth missing (living people)